The Samsung Galaxy J2 (2016) is an Android smartphone manufactured by Samsung Electronics. It was unveiled and released in July 2016.

Specifications

Hardware 
The Galaxy J2 (2016) is powered by a Spreadtrum SC8830 SoC including a quad-core 1.5 GHz ARM Cortex-A7 CPU, an ARM Mali-400MP2 GPU and 1.5 GB RAM. The 8 GB internal storage can be upgraded up to 256 GB via microSD card.

It features a 5.0-inch Super AMOLED display with a HD Ready (720×1280px) resolution. It has an 8megapixels main camera with f/2.2 aperture, LED flash, autofocus and HDR; the front camera has 5megapixels and f/2.2 aperture. A notification ring called Smart Glow is settled around the main camera.

Software 
The Galaxy J2 (2016) is shipped with Android 6.0.1 "Marshmallow" and Samsung's TouchWiz user interface.

See also 
 Samsung Galaxy
 Samsung Galaxy J series

References 

Android (operating system) devices
Samsung smartphones
Mobile phones introduced in 2016
Samsung Galaxy
Discontinued smartphones
Mobile phones with user-replaceable battery